Striped stream frog refers to two frog species:

Hylarana signata, a true frog species from Southeast Asia.
Strongylopus fasciatus, a true frog species from Africa.

Animal common name disambiguation pages